La Patinoire Municipale is an indoor ice venue located in Grenoble, France. Completed in 1963, it hosted some of the ice hockey competitions for the 1968 Winter Olympics. During those games, it seated 2700.

The venue also hosted the 1964 European Figure Skating Championships. In 2001, the building became a gymnasium called Halle Clemenceau.

References
1968 Winter Olympics official report. pp. 106, 108. 
History of the Grenoble hockey club. Accessed 1 November 2010.

Venues of the 1968 Winter Olympics
Indoor ice hockey venues in France
Olympic ice hockey venues
Sports venues in Grenoble
Sports venues completed in 1963